Rani Moorthy is a Malaysian-born playwright, actress, and artistic director of Rasa Productions. Following the race riots of 1969 her family tried to emigrate to Singapore, but were unsuccessful for a time. When they eventually made it, Moorthy began her acting career, appearing in theatre and hosting The Ra Ra Show, a television comedy. In 1996, she emigrated to the United Kingdom. Rani was educated at the 'National University of Singapore.

Works

Radio
 Whose Sari Now (2007)
 Broadcast between 1 and 5 October 2007 as part of BBC Radio 4's Woman's Hour Drama strand.

Stage
 Pooja (2002)
 Manchester United and the Malay Warrior (2002)
 Curry Tales (2004)
 Too Close to Home (2006)
 Shades of Brown (2007)

Television
 Doctors
 Episode "Martial Arts" (aired 6 March 2002 on BBC One)
 : Citizen Khan (Broadcast 27 August 2012 on BBC One)
 Minor recurring role as Mrs. Bilal

References

External links
 Rani Moorthy at the British Film Institute
 

Year of birth missing (living people)
Living people
Malaysian actresses
Malaysian dramatists and playwrights
People from Kuala Lumpur
Malaysian emigrants to the United Kingdom
Malaysian Hindus
Malaysian people of Indian descent